The Reprieve is a 1913 Australian melodrama film directed by W. J. Lincoln about a man on trial for killing his unfaithful wife. It is considered a lost film. Contemporary reviews were positive.

Plot
Richard Gannon discovers his wife Amy has been cheating on him with a man called Jim Williams and accidentally kills her in a fit of anger by pushing her over a cliff. He is arrested and sentenced to death but the judge recommends mercy and asks the Home Secretary for a reprieve.

The Home Secretary at first refuses, but when he mistakenly comes to believe that his own wife is unfaithful with a former lover, he realises how easy it would have been to kill her.

After this, he grants a reprieve for Gannon and resolves to show his wife more affection.

The chapter headings were:
Condemned to Death. 
The Power of Love. 
Leave my House, you Scoundrel.
Should a faithless woman be destroyed.
I have killed Her. 
The Vigil of the Night.
A story that will hold you spell-bound.
You are no better than Richard Gannon, the man you refuse to reprieve.

Cast
Roy Redgrave
Beryl Bryant
Godfrey Cass
George Bryant
Tom Cannam
Violet Grey
Ward Lyons
Charles Wheeler
John Brunton
Jessie Brown

Production
The film was the fifth production from Lincoln Cass.

References

External links
The Reprieve at IMDb
The Reprieve at AustLit
The Reprieve at National Film and Sound Archive

Australian black-and-white films
Australian silent feature films
1913 films
Lost Australian films
Australian drama films
1913 drama films
Melodrama films
1913 lost films
Lost drama films
Films directed by W. J. Lincoln
Silent drama films